This is a list of glaciers in Greenland. Details on the size and flow of some of the major Greenlandic glaciers are listed by Eric Rignot and Pannir Kanagaratnam (2006)

Ice sheets and caps

Greenland Ice Sheet
Christian Erichsen Ice Cap
Flade Isblink
Gungner Ice Cap
Hans Tausen Ice Cap
Heimdal Ice Cap
Hurlbut Glacier
Ismarken
Mælkevejen
Maniitsoq Ice Cap (Sukkertoppen)
Storm Ice Cap
Upper Frederiksborg Glacier

Other glaciers

A. Harmsworth Glacier
Aage Bertelsen Glacier
Academy Glacier, N
Academy Glacier, NW
Adolf Hoel Glacier
Akuliarutsip Sermerssua
Amdrup Glacier
Apusiaajik Glacier
Balder Glacier
Bernstorff Glacier
Borgjokel Glacier
Bowdoin Glacier
Bredebrae
Bruckner Glacier
C. H. Ostenfeld Glacier
Chamberlin Glacier
Christian IV Glacier
Copeland Glacier (Pasterze Glacier)
Daugaard-Jensen Glacier
Diebitsch Glacier
Docker Smith Glacier
Dodge Glacier
Ejnar Mikkelsen Glacier
F. Graae Glacier
Fan Glacier
Farquhar Glacier
Fenris Glacier
Fimbul Glacier
Frederiksborg Glacier
Frederikshaab Glacier 
Gade Glacier
Garm (glacier)
Gerard de Geer Glacier
Gerd Glacier 
Guldfaxe
Gymer Glacier 
Hagen Glacier
Hamberg Glacier
Hann Glacier
Hans Glacier
Harald Moltke Glacier
Hart Glacier
Hayes Glacier
Heilprin Glacier
Heim Glacier
Heimdal Glacier
Helheim Glacier
Helland Glacier
Henson Glacier
Hiawatha Glacier
Hubbard Glacier
Humboldt Glacier
Hutchinson Glacier
Igdlugdlip Glacier
Ikertivaq Glacier
Ingia Glacier
J.P. Koch Glacier
Jaette Glacier
Jakobshavn Isbræ
Kangerlussuaq Glacier
Kangerdlugssup Glacier
Kangerdluarssup Sermia
Kangiata Nunata Sermia
Karale Glacier
Knud Rasmussen Glacier
King Oscar Glacier
Kjer Glacier
K.J.V. Steenstrup Glacier
Kofoed-Hansen Glacier
Kronborg Glacier
L. Bistrup Bræ Glacier 
Leidy Glacier
Lille Glacier
Marie Sophie Glacier 
Melville Glacier
Midgard Glacier
Mittivakkat Glacier
Mohn Glacier
Moore Glacier
Morris Jesup Glacier
Nansen Glacier
Nioghalvfjerdsbrae
Nordenskiold Glacier NW
Nordenskiold Glacier W
Nunatak Glacier
Nunatakavsaup Glacier
Nunatakassaap Sermia
Nyeboe Glacier
Peary Glacier
Perdlerfiup Sermia
Petermann Glacier
Puisortoq
Raven Glacier
Rimfaxe
Rink Glacier
Rink Glacier (Melville Bay)
Rosenborg Glacier
Russell Glacier
Ryder Glacier
Salisbury Glacier
Scarlet Heart Glacier
Sermeq Avannarleq near Ilulissat
Sermeq Avannarleq in Uummannaq District
Sermeq Silardleq
Sermilik Qagssimiut
Sermitsiaq Glacier
Sharp Glacier
Sif Glacier
Skinfaxe
Sleipner Glacier
Spalte Glacier
Steensby Glacier
Steenstrup Glacier
Storstrømmen Glacier
Store Glacier
Storebjørn Glacier  
Sun Glacier
Sverdrup Glacier
Thomas Glacier
Tingmjarmiut
Tjalfe Glacier (SE Greenland)
Tjalfe Glacier
Tjasse Glacier
Tracy Glacier
Upernavik Isstrøm
Umiamako Glacier
Verhoeff Glacier
Vibeke Glacier
Waltershausen Glacier
Wordie Glacier
Ydun Glacier 
Ygdrasil
Ymer Glacier 
Zachariæ Isstrøm

Firns
Daniel Bruun Firn
Dreyer Firn
Rink Firn
Sven Hedin Firn

See also
List of glaciers
List of fjords of Greenland

References

External links

Locations of Greenland glaciers (archived)
Fuller list (archived)

 
GreenLand
Glaciers